Retallick is a surname originating in Cornwall, England. Notable people surnamed Retallick include:

 Katrina Retallick, Australian actress
 Culum Retallick (born 1985), New Zealand rugby player, plays for Bay of Plenty and Blues
 Brodie Retallick (born 1991), New Zealand rugby player, plays for Bay of Plenty, Chiefs and New Zealand

See also
 , a ship in Britain's Royal Navy
 Retallack (disambiguation)